Sigrid Brattabø Handegard (born 27 December 1963) is a Norwegian politician for the Centre Party.

Early life
Handegard was educated at Rogne Upper Secondary School, specialising in nursing auxiliary skills.

She worked as a nursing auxiliary in Jondal and Vikevollen between 1981 and 2007.

Elected office
Handegard was deputy mayor of Jondal 1995-2007, then Mayor 2007-2009.

From 2000-2002 she was Vice-chair of the Hordaland branch of the Centre Party then Chair 2002-2008.

Handegard served as a deputy representative to the Norwegian Parliament from Hordaland 2005 - 2009.

Later career
Since 2009, Handegard has been a political advisor to the Minister of Transport and Communications, Magnhild Meltveit Kleppa.

Handegard is married with three children.

References

1963 births
Living people
Centre Party (Norway) politicians
Deputy members of the Storting
Mayors of places in Hordaland
Women mayors of places in Norway
Jondal
20th-century Norwegian women politicians
20th-century Norwegian politicians
Women members of the Storting